"Oops (Oh My)" is a song by American singer Tweet from her debut studio album, Southern Hummingbird (2002). It features vocals from American rapper Missy "Misdemeanor" Elliott, who co-wrote the song with Tweet, while production was handled by Timbaland. The song was released on January 11, 2002, as the album's lead single.

"Oops (Oh My)" was a commercial success in the United States, peaking at number seven on the Billboard Hot 100 and topping Billboards Hot R&B/Hip-Hop Songs. Additionally, it reached number five on the UK Singles Chart. English electropop band Ladytron covered the song on their 2003 compilation album Softcore Jukebox.

Writing and composition
"Oops (Oh My)" is an R&B song featuring a techno-reggae rhythm, built on a Casio-bass clarinet loop. Although the song is widely considered to be about masturbation, Tweet explained that "[p]eople can take their definition of what any song means to them, but for me, the song wasn't about masturbation—it was about self-love." She said she was inspired to write the song after watching an episode of The Oprah Winfrey Show where a doctor advised people to look at themselves in the mirror naked in order to build self-acceptance. She added that it was "empowering" for her to write the song as she "felt like [she] didn't love [herself]" due to her skin color.

Track listings

US 12-inch single
A1. "Oops (Oh My)" (album version) (featuring Missy "Misdemeanor" Elliott)
A2. "Oops (Oh My)" (original version) (featuring Fabolous)
A3. "Oops (Oh My)" (amended version) (featuring Bubba Sparxxx)
B1. "Oops (Oh My)" (instrumental)
B2. "Oops (Oh My)" (TV track)
B3. "Oops (Oh My)" (acappella) (featuring Missy "Misdemeanor" Elliott)

Australian CD single
"Oops (Oh My)" (album version) (featuring Missy "Misdemeanor" Elliott) – 4:01
"My Place" (album version) – 4:28
"Oops (Oh My)" (amended version) (featuring Fabolous) – 4:00
"Oops (Oh My)" (amended version) (featuring Bubba Sparxxx) – 4:35

UK CD single
"Oops (Oh My)" (radio edit) (featuring Missy "Misdemeanor" Elliott) – 3:30
"Oops (Oh My)" (amended version) (featuring Bubba Sparxxx) – 4:35
"Oops (Oh My)" (amended version) (featuring Fabolous) – 4:00
"Oops (Oh My)" (video) (featuring Missy "Misdemeanor" Elliott)

UK 12-inch single
A1. "Oops (Oh My)" (radio edit) (featuring Missy "Misdemeanor" Elliott) – 3:30
A2. "Oops (Oh My)" (instrumental) – 4:00
B1. "Oops (Oh My)" (amended version) (featuring Bubba Sparxxx) – 4:35
B2. "Oops (Oh My)" (amended version) (featuring Fabolous) – 4:00

UK cassette single
"Oops (Oh My)" (radio edit) (featuring Missy "Misdemeanor" Elliott) – 3:30
"Oops (Oh My)" (amended version) (featuring Bubba Sparxxx) – 4:35
"Oops (Oh My)" (amended version) (featuring Fabolous) – 4:00

German CD single
"Oops (Oh My)" (radio edit) (featuring Missy "Misdemeanor" Elliott) – 3:30
"Oops (Oh My)" (amended version) (featuring Bubba Sparxxx) – 4:35

German CD maxi single
"Oops (Oh My)" (radio edit) (featuring Missy "Misdemeanor" Elliott) – 3:30
"Oops (Oh My)" (Dogg Town remix) (featuring Missy "Misdemeanor" Elliott) – 3:18
"Oops (Oh My)" (amended version) (featuring Bubba Sparxxx) – 4:35
"Oops (Oh My)" (original version) (featuring Fabolous) – 4:35
"Oops (Oh My)" (video) (featuring Missy "Misdemeanor" Elliott)

German 12-inch single
A1. "Oops (Oh My)" (album version) – 4:00
A2. "Oops (Oh My)" (amended version) (featuring Bubba Sparxxx) – 4:35
A3. "Oops (Oh My)" (original version) (featuring Fabolous) – 4:35
B1. "Oops (Oh My)" (Dogg Town remix) (featuring Missy "Misdemeanor" Elliott) – 3:18
B2. "Oops (Oh My)" (Dogg Town remix instrumental) – 3:18
B3. "Oops (Oh My)" (album instrumental) – 4:00
B3. "Oops (Oh My)" (album acappella) (featuring Missy "Misdemeanor" Elliott) – 3:00

Credits and personnel
Credits adapted from the liner notes of Southern Hummingbird.

 Tweet – vocals
 Missy "Misdemeanor" Elliott – vocals
 Timbaland – production
 Jimmy Douglass – engineering, mixing
 Bernie Grundman – mastering

Charts

Weekly charts

Year-end charts

Release history

See also
 List of Hot R&B/Hip-Hop Singles & Tracks number ones of 2002

References

2001 songs
2002 debut singles
Elektra Records singles
Missy Elliott songs
Song recordings produced by Timbaland
Songs with feminist themes
Songs written by Missy Elliott
Songs written by Tweet (singer)
Tweet (singer) songs